Bryn y Neuadd Hospital is a mental health facility in Llanfairfechan, Conwy County Borough, Wales. It is managed by the Betsi Cadwaladr University Health Board.

History
The hospital was established by converting a mid-19th-century Italian Gothic style mansion into a facility to care for "lunatics and idiots" in 1898. The mansion, which benefited from a garden laid out by Edward Milner, was demolished in 1967 and replaced with a modern facility for mentally handicapped patients which opened in 1971. A medium-secure unit known as Tŷ Llywelyn was subsequently established at the hospital.

The gardens and grounds by Milner are designated Grade II on the Cadw/ICOMOS Register of Parks and Gardens of Special Historic Interest in Wales.

References

Hospitals in Conwy County Borough
Hospitals established in 1898
1898 establishments in Wales
Hospital buildings completed in 1971
NHS hospitals in Wales
Betsi Cadwaladr University Health Board
Registered historic parks and gardens in Gwynedd